Anisadenia is a genus of flowering plants belonging to the family Linaceae.

Its native range is Himalaya to Central China.

Species:

Anisadenia pubescens 
Anisadenia saxatilis

References

Linaceae
Malpighiales genera